Chittoor Municipal Corporation is a civic body of Chittoor in the Indian state of Andhra Pradesh. Municipal Corporation mechanism in India was introduced during British Rule with formation of municipal corporation in Madras (Chennai) in 1688, later followed by municipal corporations in Bombay (Mumbai) and Calcutta (Kolkata) by 1762. Chittoor Municipal Corporation is headed by Mayor of city and governed by Commissioner.

History
The municipality of Chittoor was constituted as a III–Grade in the year 1917. It was then upgraded to II–Grade in 1950, I–Grade in 1965, Special Grade in 1980 and then to Selection Grade in 2000. It was upgraded to corporation on 7 September 2012.

Jurisdiction 

It also includes fourteen villages namely, Obanapalli, Mangasamudram, Santhapet, Anupalli,  Bandapalle, Doddipalle, Kukkalapall, Mapakshi, Murakambattu, Muthirevula, Narigapalle, Ramapuram, Thenabanda, Thimmsanipalle and Varigapalle which were merged into the corporation.

Administration 

The corporation is administered by an elected body, headed by a mayor. The corporation population as per the 2011 Census of India was 153,756. The present commissioner of the corporation is Dr. J.Aruna and the mayor is S Amudha.

Functions 
Chittoor Municipal Corporation is created for the following functions:

 Planning for the town including its surroundings which are covered under its Department's Urban Planning Authority .
 Approving construction of new buildings and authorising use of land for various purposes.
 Improvement of the town's economic and Social status.
 Arrangements of water supply towards commercial, residential and industrial purposes.
 Planning for fire contingencies through Fire Service Departments.
 Creation of solid waste management, public health system and sanitary services.
 Working for the development of ecological aspect like development of Urban Forestry and making guidelines for environmental protection.
 Working for the development of weaker sections of the society like mentally and physically handicapped, old age and gender biased people.
 Making efforts for improvement of slums and poverty removal in the town.

Revenue sources 

The following are the Income sources for the Corporation from the Central and State Government.

Revenue from taxes 
Following is the Tax related revenue for the corporation.

 Property tax.
 Profession tax.
 Entertainment tax.
 Grants from Central and State Government like Goods and Services Tax.
 Advertisement tax.

Revenue from non-tax sources 

Following is the Non Tax related revenue for the corporation.

 Water usage charges.
 Fees from Documentation services.
 Rent received from municipal property.
 Funds from municipal bonds.

Revenue from taxes 
Following is the Tax related revenue for the corporation.

 Property tax.
 Profession tax.
 Entertainment tax.
 Grants from Central and State Government like Goods and Services Tax.
 Advertisement tax.

Revenue from non-tax sources 

Following is the Non Tax related revenue for the corporation.

 Water usage charges.
 Fees from Documentation services.
 Rent received from municipal property.
 Funds from municipal bonds.

References

Municipal corporations in India
Municipal corporations in Andhra Pradesh
Local government in Andhra Pradesh
1917 establishments in India
2012 establishments in Andhra Pradesh